Antoine Saade (born 9 July 1944) is a Lebanese former sports shooter. He competed in the skeet event at the 1972 Summer Olympics.

References

1944 births
Living people
Lebanese male sport shooters
Olympic shooters of Lebanon
Shooters at the 1972 Summer Olympics
Place of birth missing (living people)